Anti-flash white is a white colour commonly seen on British, Soviet, and U.S. nuclear bombers. The purpose of the colour is to reflect some of the thermal radiation from a nuclear explosion, protecting the aircraft and its occupants.

China
Some variants of the Xian H-6 had the underside of the fuselage painted anti-flash white.

Soviet Union/Russia

Some nuclear bombers had the underside of the fuselage painted anti-flash white with the upper surfaces painted light silver-gray. This was true for the specially fitted, single Soviet Tu-95V bomber that test-deployed the most powerful bomb of any kind – the 50+ MT-rating Tsar Bomba on 30 October 1961 – as it had the anti-flash white on all its undersurfaces and sides.

The Tupolev Tu-160 of the 1980s was the first series-built Soviet/Russian bomber aircraft to be painted anti-flash white all over, leading to its Beliy Lebed ("White Swan") Russian nickname.

United Kingdom

Anti-flash white was used on the Royal Air Force V bombers force and the Royal Navy Blackburn Buccaneer when used in the nuclear strike role. Nuclear bombers were given – though not at first, until the problem was considered – salmon pink and baby blue roundels and fin flash rather than the traditional dark red, white and blue.

Anti-flash white was applied to several prototype aircraft, including the British Aircraft Corporation TSR-2. Paint used on the Avro Vulcan was manufactured by Cellon, and that on the Handley Page Victor by Titanine Ltd.

United States

Many Strategic Air Command nuclear bombers carried anti-flash white without insignia on the underside of the fuselage with light silver-gray or natural metal (later light camouflage) on the upper surfaces.

Other aircraft

Aircraft with at least part of the fuselage painted anti-flash white on nuclear delivery variants:

CF-105 Arrow prototypes

Xian H-6
/
Myasishchev M-4
Tupolev Tu-16
Tupolev Tu-95
Tupolev Tu-22M
Tupolev Tu-160

V bombers
Avro Vulcan
Handley Page Victor
Vickers Valiant
Blackburn Buccaneer
English Electric Canberra (experimental)
BAC TSR-2 prototype
Saunders-Roe SR.53 interceptor prototype

Convair B-36
Boeing B-47 Stratojet
Boeing B-52 Stratofortress
North American A-5 Vigilante
North American XB-70 Valkyrie prototype
Rockwell B-1 Lancer prototype

See also 
 Royal Air Force roundels
 List of colors
 The House in the Middle - film that demonstrates the thermal flash protective effects of the related white wash paint

References 

 

Explosion protection
Shades of white